The Watts Bar Nuclear Plant is a Tennessee Valley Authority (TVA) nuclear reactor pair used for electric power generation. It is located on a 1,770-acre (7.2 km²) site in Rhea County, Tennessee, near Spring City, between the cities of Chattanooga and Knoxville. Watts Bar supplies enough electricity for about 1,200,000 households in the Tennessee Valley.

The plant, construction of which began in 1973, has two Westinghouse pressurized water reactor units: Unit 1, completed in 1996, and Unit 2, completed in 2015. Unit 1 has a winter net dependable generating capacity of 1,167 megawatts. Unit 2 has a capacity of 1,165 megawatts. 

As of 2022, both units are the newest operating civilian reactors to come online in the United States, and Unit 2 is the first and only new power reactor to enter service in the 21st century in the US.

Unit 1

The construction began on 23 January 1973, and suffered from many delays. After construction was halted on both units in 1985, construction resumed on Unit 1 in 1992. First criticality was achieved on 1 January 1996 and commercial operation began on May 5, 1996.

Unit 2
Unit 2 construction started in 1972.  
Unit 2 was 60% complete when construction on both units was stopped in 1985 due in part to a projected decrease in power demand., In 2007, the Tennessee Valley Authority (TVA) Board approved completion of Unit 2 on August 1, and construction resumed on October 15. The project was expected to cost $2.5 billion, and employ around 2,300 contractor workers. Once finished, it was expected to employ 250 people in permanent jobs. The final cost of the plant is estimated at $6.1 billion.

A year after the 2011 Tōhoku earthquake and tsunami and subsequent Fukushima Daiichi nuclear disaster, the Nuclear Regulatory Commission (NRC) issued 9 orders to improve safety at domestic plants. Two applied to Watts Bar Unit 2 and required design modifications: "Mitigation Strategies Order" and "Spent Fuel Pool Instrumentation Order". In February 2012, TVA said the design modifications to Watts Bar 2 were partially responsible for the project running over budget and behind schedule. The second unit costs a total of $4.7 billion bringing the total costs of the two unit plant to more than $12 billion.

TVA declared construction substantially complete in August 2015 and requested that NRC staff proceed with the final licensing review; on October 22, the NRC approved a forty-year operating license for Unit 2, marking the formal end of construction and allowing for the installation of nuclear fuel and subsequent testing. On December 15, 2015, TVA announced that the reactor was fully loaded with fuel and ready for criticality and power ascension tests. In March 2016, the Nuclear Regulatory Commission described the project as a "chilled work environment," where employees are reluctant to raise safety concerns for fear of retribution.

On May 23, 2016, initial criticality was achieved. , a transformer fire had delayed the start of commercial operation past the late summer goal. Commercial operation started in October 2016, once the affected transformer was replaced, operators completed the inspection on the switchyard affected equipment and the final full power testing was completed. On October 19, 2016 the Watts Bar 2 was the first United States reactor to enter commercial operation since 1996. Due to failures in its condenser, TVA took it offline on March 23, 2017. The condenser, which was installed during the original construction phase of the plant in the 1970s, suffered a structural failure in one of its sections. On August 1, 2017 the unit was restarted after four months of repairs to the condenser.

It will likely be the last Generation II reactor to be completed in the US.

In 2022 the four original steam generator units were replaced.

Electricity Production

Tritium production
The NRC operating license for Watts Bar was modified in September 2002 to allow irradiation of tritium-producing burnable absorber rods at Watts Bar to produce tritium for the U.S. Department of Energy's (DOE's) National Nuclear Security Administration in order to maintain the viability of America's nuclear weapons. Tritium, the fusion fuel in nuclear weapons, has a half-life of 12.5 years, which means it decays at 5.5% per year, and must be renewed.  The Watts Bar license amendment permits TVA to irradiate up to approximately 2,000 tritium-producing rods in the Watts Bar reactor.

TVA began irradiating tritium-producing rods at Watts Bar Unit 1 in the fall of 2003. TVA removed these rods from the reactor in the spring of 2005. DOE successfully shipped them to its tritium-extraction facility at Savannah River Site in South Carolina. DOE reimburses TVA for the cost of providing the irradiation services, and also pays TVA a fee for each tritium-producing rod that is irradiated. During the times the reactor does this, it must be fuelled with "unobligated" uranium, (uranium that is not legally or contractually restricted to peaceful-use-only, as most commercial reactor uranium is). Technology and equipment as well as the fuel used to produce it must be of US origin.

Surrounding population 

The 2010 U.S. population within  of Watts Bar was 18,452, an increase of 4.1 percent in a decade, according to an analysis of U.S. Census data for msnbc.com. The 2010 U.S. population within  was 1,186,648, an increase of 12.8 percent since 2000.

Seismic risk 
The Nuclear Regulatory Commission's estimate of the risk each year of an earthquake intense enough to cause core damage to the reactor at Watts Bar was 1 in 27,778, according to an NRC study published in August 2010. The 2018 Southern Appalachian earthquake's epicenter was located two miles east of the facility. The TVA reported that their facilities are designed to withstand seismic events and were not impacted by the earthquake, but personnel would conduct further inspections as a precaution.

See also

 Watts Bar Dam
 Watts Bar Steam Plant
 List of the largest nuclear power stations in the United States
 List of power stations in Tennessee

Notes

References

External links

 
  
 
 
 
 

Energy infrastructure completed in 1996
Energy infrastructure completed in 2016
Tennessee Valley Authority
Nuclear power stations using pressurized water reactors
Buildings and structures in Rhea County, Tennessee
Nuclear power plants in Tennessee
1996 establishments in Tennessee